NPG Asia Materials is a peer-reviewed open access scientific journal focusing on materials science. It was established in 2009 and is published by the Nature Publishing Group. The founding editor-in-chief was Hideo Takezoe (Tokyo Institute of Technology); the current editor-in-chief is Martin Vacha (Tokyo Institute of Technology).

Abstracting and indexing 
The journal is abstracted and indexed in:
 Chemical Abstract Services
 Science Citation Index Expanded
 Scopus
According to the Journal Citation Reports, the journal has a 2021 impact factor of 10.990.

References

External links 
 

Nature Research academic journals
English-language journals
Continuous journals
Materials science journals
Creative Commons Attribution-licensed journals
Publications established in 2009